is a railway station on the Keisei Main Line in the town of Shisui, Chiba Japan, operated by the private railway operator Keisei Electric Railway.

Lines
Keisei-Shisui Station is served by the Keisei Main Line, and is 55.0 kilometers from the Tokyo terminus of the Keisei Main Line at Keisei-Ueno Station.

Station layout
The station consists of two opposed side platforms connected to an elevated station building.

Platforms

History
Keisei Shisui Station was opened on 9 December 1926.

Station numbering was introduced to all Keisei Line stations on 17 July 2010; Keisei-Shisui Station was assigned station number KS37.

Passenger statistics
In fiscal 2019, the station was used by an average of 6713 passengers daily.

Surrounding area
 Shisui Town Hall
 Shisui Municipal Library
 Tokyo Gakkan High School

See also
 List of railway stations in Japan

References

External links

  Keisei Station information

Railway stations in Chiba Prefecture
Railway stations in Japan opened in 1926
Keisei Main Line
Shisui